The following is a list of episodes of Disney Channel Asia original television series, Waktu Rehat. The series premiered on August 31, 2010 and ended on December 7, 2012, with a total of 43 episodes over the course of 3 seasons.

Series overview

Episodes

Season 1 (2010)

Season 2 (2011)

Season 3 (2012)

Lists of sitcom episodes
Lists of Disney Channel television series episodes